Roselle Paulino Nava-Tan (born March 28, 1976), professionally and more commonly known as Roselle Nava, is a Filipino singer, film and television actress, and former politician. She is a multi-platinum female singer in the Philippines and one of the most in-demand divas during the 90s era. She is tagged as the "Philippines' Sentimental Diva" and the "former supreme songbird of ABS-CBN". She was formerly dubbed as the "90s Philippine Pop Queen". She started her career as a part of ABS-CBN's defunct youth-oriented show Ang TV (1992–1997) together with Jolina Magdangal, Claudine Barretto, Antoinette Taus, etc. She was also a regular host and performer of ASAP, the Philippines longest variety show, from 1995 to 2004 and since 2015.

She is the singer behind the hits like Bakit Nga Ba Mahal Kita, Maniniwala Ba Ako, Dahil Mahal Na Mahal Kita, Laging Ikaw Parin, Ikaw Pala, Mahal Mo Ba'y Di Na Ako, and Huwag Ka Nang Babalik.

Showbiz career

From 1994 to 1995, she was hailed as the Best Female Singer of the Year for the song You by Awit Awards. In 1994, her very first signature hit, Bakit Nga Ba Mahal Kita (Why Do I Love You?), became the number one charted song in the Philippines and stayed in the radio charts for 8 months from 1994 to 1995. It became the theme song of many Filipinos who went through heart breaks and got lost in love.

In 1997, however her commercialized success of Dahil Mahal Na Mahal Kita, her carrier single from her 3rd album (Roselle: On Higher Ground), emerged immediate success and even spanned a film with the same name and even in album registry.

To date, Dahil Mahal Na Mahal Kita was also covered four times by different artists: Rachelle Ann Go for The Gulong Ng Palad (2006) Soundtrack and Zsa Zsa Padilla's rendition for the Afternoon Soap theme Magkano Ang Iyong Dangal? in 2010, in 2013 by Vice Ganda for the soundtrack of the Primetime series Huwag Ka Lang Mawawala, and in 2018, Jonalyn Viray (aka Jona), for the teleserye Asintado.

In 2000, she revived the Barry Manilow song "Somewhere Down The Road" for the Blockbuster Film "Minsan Minahal Kita" which also was included in the Original Motion Picture Soundtrack; and in 2002, her comeback platinum hit with Star Records "Huwag Ka Nang Magbabalik for the film Ngayong Nandito Ka and Jologs.

In 2002, Roselle was chosen as the interpreter for the song, Free, composed by Gino Torres. The demo version was recorded by Carol Banawa. But the composer chose Roselle to do the final and live version. It became as one of the finalists of ABS-CBN's JAM: Himig Handog sa Makabagong Kabataan. It also became the theme song of ABS-CBN's summer station ID in the same year.

Roselle Nava's last album with Star Records (ABS-CBN's recording outfit) All About Love achieved the Platinum Status but was never awarded to her. She moved to Viva Entertainment Agency and signed up for several projects. VIVA did not commercialise her artistry as her recent albums got no awards. The poor sales performance of her albums affected her singing career.

In 2010, Bakit Nga Ba Mahal Kita was also re-recorded by Laarni Lozada for the Afternoon Drama "Alyna"; and Kakai Bautista, Philippines' Dental Diva, as her carrier single for her debut album under Star Music in 2017.

Vocal profile 
Roselle's voice can be classified as soprano as her style is very similar with Regine Velasquez's singing prowess. She suffered from a throat virus which affected the brilliance of her voice. She was able to cope up through healing sessions and support of her fans.

Recent trends 
In 2009, she was part of the talked-about successful concert entitled "Divas of the 90s", produced by VIVA Entertainment Company. Her co-performers were Geneva Cruz, Jessa Zaragoza, and Rachel Alejandro.

On February 13, 2016, she also had a successful concert with other OPM icons entitled LOVE THROWBACK held in PICC (Philippine International Convention Center).

On February 4, 2018, Roselle was given a tribute by ASAP as one of the OPM gems in the country. She sang her signature hits with ABS-CBN's homegrown talents. The tribute showed how she started as a prime diva of ABS-CBN and what's her life now. Roselle was awarded a plaque of recognition with her contribution to OPM.

Personal life
She married Allen Ford Tan on January 18, 2010, at the Manila Cathedral in Manila. They have two sons: Rafa and Ram. Rafa is currently a contestant on The Voice Kids season 5 as part of Martin Nievera's MarTeam.

Filmography
The Voice Kids (2023)
Masked Singer Pilipinas (2020)
I Can See Your Voice (January 6, 2018; December 29, 2018 with Nikki Valdez and Desiree del Valle)
The Singing Bee (2014)
Sarah G. Live (2012)
Babang Luksa (2011)
Masayang Tanghali Bayan (TV show) (2003-2004)
I Think I'm In Love (2002)
Bayani (1997) - Atang de la Rama
Mangarap Ka (1995)
Hataw Na (1995)
ASAP 20 (TV show) (1995-2003; 2010, 2015–present)
Oki Doki Doc (TV sitcom) (1993-2007)
Ang TV (TV show) (1992)

Discography

Roselle (1994)
 Label: Ivory Records Corporation
 Release date: 1994
 Certification: PARI: Platinum (40,000 copies sold)

Track listing
 You — Best Performance by a Female Recording Artist Awit Awards (1995)
 Bakit Nga Ba Mahal Kita — Movie soundtrack Mangarap Ka (1995)
 Is It My Imagination
 Iba Tayo
 Sana (Ako'y Nasa Langit Na)
 Wag Mo Na Lang Pansinin
 Got To Be There
 Sana'y Di Magtagal
 Ngayon
 Pag-ibig Na Sana (duet with Tony Lambino)

Say It Again (1995)
 Label: Ivory Records Corporation
 Release date: 1995
 Certification: PARI: Platinum (40,000 copies sold)

Track listing
 Waiting For You
 Say It Again
 Habang Narito Ako
 Woncha Dance With Me
 How Many Ways
 Nasaan Ka Na?
 Higit Pa Sa Isang Kaibigan
 How Can I?
 Maniniwala Ba Ako?
 Say That You Love Me — Movie soundtrack Hataw Na (1995)

On Higher Ground (1997)
 Label: Star Recording, Inc.
 Release date: 1997
 Certification: PARI: Double Platinum (80,000 copies sold)

Track listing
 Dahil Mahal Na Mahal Kita — Movie soundtrack Dahil Mahal Na Mahal Kita (1998)
 He's Somehow Been (A Part Of Me)
 Laging Ikaw Pa Rin
 Para Sa 'Yo
 Do You Love Me?
 Please Stay
 Ikaw Pala
 I Should Have Never Cried
 Upang Muli Ay Magmahal
 Is It A Dream
 You Are (For Daddy)
 Nothing's Gonna Make Me (Change)

Simply Roselle (1999)
 Label: Star Recording, Inc.
 Release date: 1999
 Certification: PARI: Gold (20,000 copies sold)

Track listing
 Mahal Mo Ba'y Di Na Ako
 Miles Away
 Tanging Mamahali'y Ikaw
 Lost In You
 Bihag Ng Pag-ibig
 Dahan-dahan
 Sana Man Lang
 Upper Floor
 Kahit 'Sang Sandali
 Magbakakasakali Ngayon
 Get Out
 Nag-iisang Dahilan

All About Love (2002)
 Label: Star Recording, Inc.
 Release date: 2002
 Certification: PARI: Platinum (40,000 copies sold - Never awarded to Roselle)

Track listing
 Huwag Ka Nang Magbabalik
 Akalain Ko Ba
 Dahil Ako'y Mahal Mo Na
 Naiiyak Muli
 Kung Alam Ko Lang
 Open
 Say Goodbye
 Bakit Ba
 Love Me Tonight
 Kung Magmamahal
 My Love
 Minamahal, Sinasamba

Bare (2004)
 Label: Viva Records Corporation
 Release date: 2004

Track listing
 Bakit Lumisan Ka?
 Makakaya Ko Ba?
 I Really Miss You
 Kahit Ika'y Panaginip Lang
 Araw-araw
 A Prayer Away
 Someone Help Me Let Go
 Dahil Kaya Mahal Pa Rin Kita
 Can't Go On
 Kulang Pa Ba (Ang Nadarama)
 Free From You
 If You Remember Me

Forever Love Songs (2009)
 Label: Viva Records Corporation
 Release date: 2009

Track listing
 No More Rhyme
 Lost In Space
 I Love You All The Way
 Heaven Knows
 Fixing A Broken Heart
 What's Forever For
 What Might Have Been
 Miss You Like Crazy
 Looking Through Your Eyes
 As I Lay Me Down
 Where Do Broken Hearts Go
 What I Did For Love

Compilation appearances

1998 Starstruck album “Dahil Mahal Na Mahal Kita” 1998 
2000 Starstruck 3 “Mahal Mo Ba’y Di Na Ako?”

See also
Jolina Magdangal
Carol Banawa
Tootsie Guevara

References

External links

Roselle Nava albums
Roselle Nava songs lyrics

1976 births
Living people
Star Magic
Viva Artists Agency
Star Music artists
Viva Records (Philippines) artists
Filipino film actresses
Filipino television actresses
Filipino actor-politicians
People from Parañaque
Liberal Party (Philippines) politicians
United Nationalist Alliance politicians
Singers from Metro Manila
Metro Manila city and municipal councilors
Filipino sopranos
De La Salle University alumni
21st-century Filipino singers
21st-century Filipino women singers